A pontiff (from Latin pontifex) was, in Roman antiquity, a member of the most illustrious of the colleges of priests of the Roman religion, the College of Pontiffs. The term "pontiff" was later applied to any high or chief priest and, in Roman Catholic ecclesiastical usage, to bishops, especially the Pope, who is sometimes referred to as the Roman Pontiff or the Supreme Pontiff.

Etymology
The English term derives through Old French pontif from Latin pontifex, a word commonly held to come from the Latin root words pons, pont- (bridge) + facere (to do, to make), and so to have the literal meaning of "bridge-builder", presumably between mankind and the deity/deities. The role of bridges in ancient religions, associated with resurrection, redemption and the Judgement Day is already well known. Uncertainty prevailing, this may be only a folk etymology, but it may also recall ancient tasks and magic rites associated with bridges. The term may also be an allusion to Ancient Roman Religious rituals for placating the gods and spirits associated with the Tiber River, for instance. Also, Varro cites this position as meaning "able to do".

Ancient Rome

There were four chief colleges of priests in ancient Rome, the most illustrious of which was that of the pontifices. The others were those of the augures, the quindecimviri sacris faciundis, and the epulones. The same person could be a member of more than one of these groups. Including the pontifex maximus, who was president of the college, there were originally three or five pontifices, but the number increased over the centuries, finally becoming 16 under Julius Caesar. By the third century BC the pontiffs had assumed control of the state religious system.

Biblical usage 
Inspiration for the Christian (Catholic) use of the name "pontiff" for a bishop comes from the use of the same word (in Latin, pontifex, not "pontifex maximus") for the Jewish High Priest in the original Latin translation of the Bible, the Vulgate, where it appears 59 times. And in the Vulgate version of Paul's Letter to the Hebrews, "pontifex" (singular) is repeatedly used with reference to the then still extant High Priesthood in Judaism, and analogously suggesting Jesus as the ultimate high priest.

Catholicism

The word "pontiff", though now most often used in relation to a pope, technically refers to any Catholic bishop. The phrase "Roman Pontiff" is therefore not tautological, but means "Bishop of Rome". In the same way, a Pontifical Mass is a mass celebrated by a bishop, not necessarily a pope. Note also "the Pontifical" (the liturgical book containing the prayers and ceremonies for rites used by a bishop) and "pontificals", the insignia of his order that a bishop uses when celebrating Pontifical Mass. While the pontificals primarily belong to bishops, they have also been granted by papal favour or legally established Church custom to certain presbyters (e.g., abbots).

Other religions

The word has been employed in English also for caliphs (Islam) and swamis and jagadgurus (Hinduism).

See also 
 Papal titles
 Shaman

References 

Ancient Roman titles
Religious leadership roles
Christian terminology
Catholic ecclesiastical titles
Papal titles